The Southwest Motors Events Center (originally the Colorado State Fair Events Center) is a multi-purpose arena located in Pueblo, Colorado. The arena is located on the northwest corner of the Colorado State Fairgrounds and is predominantly used during the Colorado State Fair. The venue can host an array of events, including: concerts, professional bull riding, indoor football, basketball games and monster truck shows.

About
The arena was purposed in 1990 initially to replace the aging Grandstand at the Colorado State Fair. At first, an outdoor amphitheater was purposed. However, this was later dismissed in favor of the arena and a year-round use. The arena was also a draw for big-name acts to perform in the Pueblo area, thus a need for it to be bigger than the Massari Arena. Construction began in 1993 during the fair's off season. The arena opened August 23, 1995, with a performance by Petra.

In 2016, it was to be home to the Steel City Menace of American Indoor Football, however, the contract with the Menace fell through and the team played at an outdoor field prior to folding mid-season.

External links
Colorado State Fair website

References

Music venues in Colorado
Basketball venues in Colorado
Buildings and structures in Pueblo, Colorado
Tourist attractions in Pueblo, Colorado
Indoor arenas in Colorado
Sports venues in Colorado